Sangwan Foengdee (born 9 July 1951) is a Thai diver. He competed in the men's 3 metre springboard event at the 1976 Summer Olympics.

References

1951 births
Living people
Sangwan Foengdee
Sangwan Foengdee
Divers at the 1976 Summer Olympics
Place of birth missing (living people)